Charles Grant MacNeil (December 12, 1892 – March 31, 1976) (known as Grant MacNeil) was an organizer and Member of Parliament for the Co-operative Commonwealth Federation (CCF) in Canada.

A salesman by profession, MacNeill was elected to the House of Commons of Canada as the MP for Vancouver North in the 1935 federal election. He was defeated in the 1940 federal election and moved to provincial politics where he was elected as the CCF MLA for Vancouver-Burrard in the 1941 British Columbia general election. He was defeated in his 1945 re-election bid. MacNeil served as president of the British Columbia section of the party in the 1950s. He was also active with the International Woodworkers of America in British Columbia, working as editor of the IWA's Lumber Worker newspaper into the 1970s.

MacNeil was appointed Executive Secretary of the British Columbia Security Council (BCSC) board and only accepted the position in an attempt to ensure the fair treatment for Japanese Canadians being uprooted from their homes on the West Coast after the Pearl Harbor attack during World War II.

References

External links
 

1892 births
1976 deaths
Co-operative Commonwealth Federation MPs
British Columbia Co-operative Commonwealth Federation MLAs
20th-century Canadian politicians
Members of the House of Commons of Canada from British Columbia
International Woodworkers of America people